Berk Atan (born 26 September 1991) is a Turkish actor and model.

Life and career 
Atan was born on 26 September 1991 in Izmir. His paternal family is of Bosnian descent. His father and his family are football players. Also, Berk Atan left his goalkeeper career since childhood. He graduated from Beykent University in the department of acting.

Atan was chosen as one of the "Best Promises" on the 2011 Best Model of Turkey. Then, he is the winner of 2012 Best Model of Turkey.

He made his acting debut in the series Her Şey Yolunda and portrayed the character of Selçuk Demircioğlu. He is mostly known for his role in youth series Güneşin Kızları as Savaş alongside Burcu Özberk, in family comedy drama series Gönül Dağı and as Selim in Cennet'in Gözyaşları alongside Almila Ada.

Filmography

References

External links 
  
 
Biography of Berk Atan on celebs99

1991 births
Turkish male television actors
Turkish male models
Living people
Beykent University alumni
Actors from İzmir